Craig Innis Mackay (April 1, 1927 – February 28, 2020) was a Canadian speed skater who competed at the 1948 Winter Olympics and 1952 Winter Olympics. He was born in Banff, Alberta and raised in Saskatoon, Saskatchewan, where he moved when he was three years old. He was a member of the Saskatchewan Sports Hall of Fame and Saskatoon Sports Hall of Fame.

References

1927 births
2020 deaths
People from Banff, Alberta
Sportspeople from Alberta
Sportspeople from Saskatoon
Olympic speed skaters of Canada
Speed skaters at the 1948 Winter Olympics
Speed skaters at the 1952 Winter Olympics
Canadian male speed skaters